The Cray C90 series (initially named the Y-MP C90) was a vector processor supercomputer launched by Cray Research in 1991. The C90 was a development of the Cray Y-MP architecture. Compared to the Y-MP, the C90 processor had a dual vector pipeline and a faster 4.1 ns clock cycle (244 MHz), which together gave three times the performance of the Y-MP processor. The maximum number of processors in a system was also doubled from eight to 16. The C90 series used the same Model E IOS (Input/Output Subsystem) and UNICOS operating system as the earlier Y-MP Model E. 

The C90 series included the C94, C98 and C916 models (configurations with a maximum of four, eight, and 16 processor respectively) and the C92A and C94A (air-cooled models). Maximum SRAM memory was between 1 and 8 GB, depending on model.

The D92, D92A, D94 and D98  (also known as the C92D, C92AD, C94D and C98D respectively) variants were equipped with slower, but higher-density DRAM memory, allowing increased maximum memory sizes of up to 16 GB, depending on the model.

The successor system was the Cray T90.

External links
Cray Research and Cray computers FAQ Part 5

Reference 
Computer-related introductions in 1991
C90
Vector supercomputers